Milagros Marcos Ortega (born 14 June 1965) is a Spanish politician and civil servant. She is a member of the People's Party of Castile and León, and was the minister of agriculture and livestock of
the Junta of Castile and León from 2011 to 2019. Milagros Marcos also elected deputy of the XIII and XIV legislatures. She was councilor for family and equality and manager of social services.

Biography
Milagros Marcos was born in Palencia, Spain. Milagros Marcos is married and has two children. She studied at the University of Valladolid and received a bachelor of philosophy from the University of Valladolid. Milagros Marcos is general director of health and social planning. Milagros Marcos was spokesman of the Junta of Castile and León, from 2016 to 2019. Milagros Marcos was also in charge of the departments of culture, environment and health in the Junta of Castile and León.

References 

1965 births
Living people
20th-century Spanish women politicians
21st-century Spanish women politicians 
People's Party (Spain) politicians